The Australian Dental Association (ADA) is a national body for the dental profession in Australia established in .

References

External links
Australian Dental Association Website

Dental organizations
Medical associations based in Australia
Dentistry in Australia
1928 establishments in Australia